Billy Woodward may refer to:

 William Woodward Jr. (1920–1955), heir to the Hanover National Bank fortune, shot to death by his wife
 Billy Woodward (footballer) (1907–1975), English footballer

See also
William Woodward (disambiguation)